Mahmoud Al-Zoubi (1935 – 21 May 2000) was Prime Minister of Syria from 1 November 1987 to 7 March 2000.

Early life
Al-Zoubi was born into a Sunni family in 1935 in Khirbet Ghazaleh, a village 75 miles south of Damascus in the Hauran region.

Prime Minister of Syria
Al-Zoubi was a member of the Ba'ath Party. Under the rule of then President Hafez Assad, Al-Zoubi was appointed Prime Minister in 1987. He presided over a ramshackle purportedly socialist governmental and economic system. Military and government officials exercised immense power and continue to do so. Only oil revenues kept the economy going. Even foreign aid programmes struggled to implement under the weight of bureaucratic obduracy.

Ubiquitous regulations including price-control had the effect most observers say of stifling legitimate enterprise. Many officials are forced into corruption to supplement meager salaries. It is said that corruption extended all the way to the top Syria's government.

When President Hafez Assad was showing signs of poor health in the late 1990s, supporters of his son Bashar Assad started positioning him to succeed him as President. Hafez was also a major player in these maneuverings. Syria is a republic where there was no direct transfer of power envisaged in the constitution from father to son.

As Hafez Assad grew sick, it became clear both father and son had decided that Al-Zoubi's days were numbered. Tackling corruption is a popular cause among most Syrians, who see the immense wealth created at their expense as a reason why the Syrian economy has struggled to grow. The dragging down of once swaggering officials, with punishments including jail and the confiscation and auction of their illegally obtained assets earned Bashar much kudos in the community.

On 7 March 2000, Al-Zoubi was replaced as prime minister by Mohammed Mustafa Mero.

Currency crisis
During 1985-2000, Al-Zoubi's administration failed to arrest the 90 per cent fall in the worth of the Syrian Pound from 3 to 47 to the US Dollar.

Downfall and the Airbus deal controversy
On 10 May 2000, Hafez Assad expelled Al-Zoubi from the Ba'ath Party and decided that Al-Zoubi should be prosecuted over a scandal involving the French aircraft manufacturer Airbus. Al-Zoubi's assets were frozen by the Syrian government. Al-Zoubi and several senior ministers were officially accused of receiving illegal commissions of the order of US$124 million in relation to the purchase of six Airbus 320-200 passenger jets for Syrian Arab Airlines in 1996. The indictment alleged that the normal cost of the planes was US$250 million, but the Government paid $374 million and Airbus sent on US$124 million to the senior ministers. Three others involved in the transaction, including the former minister for economic affairs and the former minister for transport were sentenced to prison for ten years.

The French company Airbus denied paying off the Syrian officials. The Syrian government in September 2003 announced its intention of purchasing six more Airbus planes for the government airline. The official finding within Syrian courts that Airbus paid over a hundred million dollars in bribes to their officials is apparently not a factor in deciding whether to continue to do business with them, especially with Boeing aircraft and spare parts being difficult to attain due to unilateral US sanctions.

Personal life
Al-Zoubi was married and had three sons and a daughter. His sons were Miflih, Hammam and Karim Al-Zoubi.

Death and burial
Al-Zoubi died on 21 May 2000. Conflicting reports say he died at age 62 or 65. According to a statement from the Interior Ministry, carried by the official Syrian Arab News Agency, Al-Zoubi shot himself in the head at his home in Dumer outside Damascus. The statement said Al-Zoubi died by suicide after learning that the Damascus police chief had come to his house to serve a judicial notice to appear before an investigating judge to answer allegations of corruption and other violations "that caused great harm to the national economy." An Interior Ministry spokesman said "a shot was heard upstairs and that was a shot fired by Zohbi at himself by his own pistol on the second floor of his house where his wife and children were present." The spokesman said Al-Zoubi was rushed to the Mowasat hospital in Damascus, where he later died. Hospital officials said none of his family accompanied him to the hospital. In June 2000, according to Lara Marlowe, there were persistent rumours that Al-Zoubi was actually murdered.

Al-Zoubi was buried at his birthplace in southern Syria. His funeral service took place in Deraa province on 22 May 2000. There were no officials at the ceremony. Sources said the funeral at Kirbit Ghazali, about 100 km south of Damascus, was a simple ceremony limited to his close family members and some of his hometown people.

References

External links

1935 births
2000 deaths
Arab Socialist Ba'ath Party – Syria Region politicians
Syrian politicians who committed suicide
Prime Ministers of Syria
Speakers of the People's Assembly of Syria
Suicides by firearm in Syria
Deaths by firearm in Syria
Syrian Sunni Muslims